Mikhail Radionov (born 9 September 1984) is a track cyclist from Simferopol in Ukraine. He became russian in 2013. In 2010 he won the bronze medal in the madison at the 2010 UEC European Track Championships in Pruszków, Poland. He competed at the 2010, 2011 and 2013 UCI Track Cycling World Championships. In 2015, he won the silver medal in the madison at the 2015 UEC European Track Championships  in Grenchen, Switzerland.

References

1984 births
Russian male cyclists
Ukrainian male cyclists
Living people
Place of birth missing (living people)
Russian track cyclists
Ukrainian track cyclists
Sportspeople from Simferopol